This is a list of wars involving the Kingdom of Denmark.

700–1300

1300–1500

1500–1699

1700–1799

1800–1945

1946–present

References and notes

See also
 Dano-Swedish war (disambiguation)
 List of Danish monarchs
 List of Danish regiments
 List of wars
 List of battles
 Military history of Denmark

 
Denmark
Wars
Wars